Ross Greer may refer to:

 Ross Greer (footballer) (born 1967), Australian/Hong Kong footballer
 Ross Greer (politician) (born 1994), Scottish politician